The men's Finn was a sailing event on the Sailing at the 2020 Summer Olympics program in Tokyo that took place between 27 July and 3 August at Kamakura, Zushi, Enoshima, Sagami Bay and Fujisawa. 11 races (the last one a medal race) were held.

The medals were presented by IOC Vice President from Singapore, Mr Ser Miang Ng (a former World Sailing Vice President) and current World Sailing Vice President Thomasz Chamera (POL).

Schedule

Results

References 

Men's Finn
Men's events at the 2020 Summer Olympics